Rafael Bastide Gutierrez also known as Raphaël Bastide (born 24 November 1977, in Bilbao) is a Spanish rugby union winger who has played professionally for Perpignan, Colomiers and, since 2004 for Auch. He played for Spain at the 1999 Rugby World Cup against Uruguay.

Notes

1977 births
Living people
Spanish rugby union players
Spain international rugby union players
Rugby union players from the Basque Country (autonomous community)
Sportspeople from Bilbao
USA Perpignan players
US Colomiers players
Rugby union wings